The Burrows Island Light is a lighthouse on the western tip of Burrows Island, facing Rosario Strait, near Anacortes, in Skagit County, Washington.

History
After repeated requests to Congress, and a petition from local mariners, funding for the construction of a light on Burrows Island was authorized on February 24, 1903.  The drawings were made by noted architect, Carl Leick, and a contract was awarded to Barnett and Farmer for construction in May of 1905.   The Lighthouse Board selected the westernmost tip of Burrows Island, near Anacortes, Washington, as the site for the new light station. The island covering more than  stands just off Fidalgo Island, and presents a rugged aspect to sailors. The Burrows Island Light, faces Rosario Strait and was first lit April 1, 1906. The Seattle Post-Intelligencer published a small photograph and enthusiastic article on May 2, 1906. "The fog signal station is a model plant and contains all the latest improvements. A fourteen foot trumpet is used to sound the warnings instead of a bell, and the contrivance is operated by the power of two powerful gasoline engines."

The Daboll trumpet fog signal blew the next year for 329 hours. The  tower is attached to the fog signal building and once held a fourth-order Fresnel lens.

Captain James Hermann and his assistant Edward Pfaff were the first keepers at the station, which consisted of four buildings: the lighthouse itself, a boathouse and shop, a small coal and oil building and the massive duplex which dominates the station.

The wood-framed lighthouse stands nears the island's shoreline, which mainly consists of sharp and rocky drop-offs that demanded a derrick be constructed for loading the station boat and bringing in supplies. Automated in 1972, the Fresnel lens was replaced with modern optics and a helicopter landing pad located where the lighthouse keeper's home formerly stood.

In 2011, the Northwest Schooner Society began a long-term restoration project of the property and its weather-damaged and vandal-ravaged buildings.

References

External links

Lighthouses in Washington (state)
Transportation buildings and structures in Skagit County, Washington